Thumboli Kadappuram is a 1995 Indian Malayalam film, written by Unni Joseph, directed by Jayaraj, starring Manoj K. Jayan and Priya Raman in the lead roles.

Plot 
Methrinju is the local ruffian at Thumboli Kadappuram who doesn't care for anyone. Philippose is a rich guy in the area whose fishing boats are blocked by the local fishermen of Thumboli Kadappuram under Methrinju. He sends goons for roughening up the locals, but they are driven away by Methrinju. Clara is in love with Methrinju and wants to marry him. Williams is another fisherman at the village who is often at loggerheads with Methrinju over trivial issues. He falls in love with Mary during a fair at local church festival and is beaten up by her brothers who are sons of Solomon, another rich businessman from the area. Williams eventually elopes with Mary and comes back to Thumboli Kadappuram but is threatened by the hostile villagers against staying there since they will have to face repercussions from the influential Solomon and his sons. However, Methrinju stands up to them and offers to help Williams which leads to them becoming thick friends. Clara advises Methrinju to turn over a good leaf and lead a family life with her, upon which he visits the church, make amends with the priest, and confesses his sins. On his return he learns of Solomon's sons attacking Williams and trying to take away Mary. He helps William in beating them up and drives them away.

When Philippose turns up at the area during the annual fish thronging season (Chaakara) to do business, he is turned away by Williams and Methrinju because of their earlier issues. Philippose who is on the lookout to break away their resistance seeks the help of Paashanam. He plots to create a split between Methrinju and Williams and starts to spread a false rumor in the village that Methrinju is having an affair with Mary behind Williams's back and is cheating on Clara, whom he had agreed to marry eventually. Clara believes the rumor and has an argument with Methrinju which ends up in him slapping her. The next day, Clara's corpse washes up in the shore and everyone deduces that she commits suicide not able to bear what had happened. Methrinju gets depressed and plans to leave the village for good since no one believes him. Paashanam overhears Philippose one day plotting to kill Paashanam himself since he is aware of the tactics played by Philippose on the villagers fearing that he might spill the beans someday. A frightened Paashanam runs to the village and reveals to Williams and Methrinju that Clara had not committed suicide and was in fact killed by Philippose’ s wayward son when he tried to molest her. Philippose and Solomons sons comes behind him to the village where they have a fight with Williams and Methrinju and are eventually beaten up by the villagers who learn the truth. Methrinju kills Philippose’ s son and is arrested.

Cast

Manoj K. Jayan as Williams
Priya Raman as Mary
Vijayaraghavan as Methrinju
Silk Smitha as Clara
Rajan P. Dev as Solomon
Indrans as Pushpangathan
Kuthiravattam Pappu as Gee Varghese
Kunjandi as Vareed
Kozhikode Narayanan Nair as Priest
Jose Prakash as Antony
A. C. Zainuddin 
Adoor Bhavani
Adoor Pankajam as Kakkamma
Eliyas Babu as Philippose
Jose Pellissery as Valappad Velayudhan
Kaduvakulam Antony
Augustine as Pashanam
Santhosh
Spadikam George as Rhomichayan
Philomina as Chanchamma
Sonia Baiju Kottarakkara  as Kochu Thresia
Rani Laurius 
Thodupuzha Vasanthy
Prem Kumar as Chalappan
K. R. Vatsala
Ragini
Baburaj
Kozhikode Sarada

Soundtrack 
The film's soundtrack contains 5 songs, all composed by Salil Chowdhary, with lyrics by O. N. V. Kurup.

References

External links

M3db

1995 films
1990s Malayalam-language films
Films scored by Salil Chowdhury